Hinsdorf is a village and a former municipality in the district of Anhalt-Bitterfeld, in Saxony-Anhalt, Germany. Since 1 January 2010, it is part of the town Südliches Anhalt.

Former municipalities in Saxony-Anhalt
Südliches Anhalt
Duchy of Anhalt